That Woman may refer to:

 That Woman (1922 film), American silent drama film
 That Woman (2003 film), French drama film